Joshua Wilson Duhon (born August 27, 1982) is an American actor. Duhon was born in McKinney, Texas, and stands 5'9”. Josh Duhon joined the cast of General Hospital in March 2007 as Logan Hayes, Lulu Spencer's eventual love interest. He left the series in September 2008 when the character was killed off.

Filmography
Boxboarders! (2006) (as Jason)

Television work
General Hospital (2007–2008) (Logan Hayes)
Criminal Minds (2006) (The Tribe, as Rammy)
Passions (2006) (Episodes #1804 & #1805 as College Guy #2)

References

External links
Interview on The Gregory Mantell Show

Josh Duhon Online
Josh Duhon Fans

1982 births
Male actors from Texas
American male soap opera actors
American male television actors
Living people
People from McKinney, Texas